Novonikolayevsky is an urban locality (a work settlement) and the administrative center of Novonikolayevsky District in Volgograd Oblast, Russia. Population:

References

Urban-type settlements in Volgograd Oblast